MPOWER is a policy package intended to assist in the country-level implementation of effective interventions to reduce the demand for tobacco, as ratified by the World Health Organization (WHO) Framework Convention on Tobacco Control. The six evidence-based components of MPOWER are:
 Monitor tobacco use and prevention policies
 Protect people from tobacco smoke
 Offer help to quit tobacco use
 Warn about the dangers of tobacco
 Enforce bans on tobacco advertising, promotion and sponsorship
 Raise taxes on tobacco

Since its launch in New York City by WHO on February 7, 2008, MPOWER has become the internationally-applicable and now widely recognized summary of the essential elements of tobacco control strategy. “MPOWER is the only document of a somewhat strategic nature that is a source of information on the spread of tobacco epidemic, as well as of suggestions concerning specific actions for supporting the fight against this epidemic.”

History
The WHO Report of the Global Tobacco Epidemic: The MPOWER Package was the first in a series of WHO reports to track the status of the tobacco epidemic and the impact of interventions to stop it. The report was launched at a news conference by Margaret Chan, Director-General of WHO with New York City Mayor Michael Bloomberg on February 7, 2008. Bloomberg Philanthropies helped fund the report. According to Bloomberg, “The report released today is revolutionary. For the first time, we have both a rigorous approach to stop the tobacco epidemic and solid data to hold us all accountable.”

Former WHO Advocacy Coordinator Kraig Klaudt developed the MPOWER brand and report's creative concept. The report was designed by Ruth Klotzel of Estúdio Infinito in São Paulo, Brazil and the text was edited by Patricia Logullo also in Brazil. According to the International Council of Communication Design Icograda, the “graphic production of the book has a unique feature. It is a rectangular cutout that goes through all the pages and houses a gift for the reader: a box designed purposely to resemble a cigarette box but containing note paper and pens. The pens are printed with the six strategic messages of the MPOWER brand – a means of enhancing message recall.”

The MPOWER report’s unique design caught the attention of journalists covering its launch. According to the Washington Post, “WHO is using marketing techniques reminiscent of the tobacco companies. It has branded the campaign MPOWER – each letter represents one of six strategies – and is eschewing scare tactics in favor of the theme ‘fresh and alive.’ Press materials came with a box that looks like a pack of cigarettes and contains a pad and pens describing the elements of the campaign.” Said Sandra Mullin, a spokeswoman for the World Lung Foundation, “We're co-opting the tobacco industry's branding strategies to capture the attention of government officials. We want to show that they don't own those mottos – freshness and fun and health.”

As of 2013, Bloomberg Philanthropies had invested US$600 million to support implementation of the MPOWER tobacco control policies. The Philanthropy works through a global network of partners to support countries implementing comprehensive tobacco control policies, including the Campaign for Tobacco-Free Kids, the CDC Foundation, Johns Hopkins Bloomberg School of Public Health, the International Union Against Tuberculosis and Lung Disease, the World Health Organization, and the World Lung Foundation. The Bloomberg's initiative also received an investment from the Bill and Melinda Gates Foundation.

Impact
The findings of a July 2013 WHO report showed that 2.3 billion people – more than a third of the world’s population – are covered by at least one effective MPOWER tobacco control measure, an increase from the 1 billion covered in 2008. In Turkey, the MPOWER strategy had helped lead to 1.2 million fewer adult smokers in the country.

Since the launch of the MPOWER strategy, 18 countries with almost 750 million citizens have passed 100% smoke-free laws including Brazil, Turkey and Pakistan. Several of the world’s largest cities have also gone smoke-free, including Mexico City, Jakarta, and China’s Harbin City. Additionally, 11 countries have passed graphic cigarette pack warning laws and seven countries have passed comprehensive advertising and sponsorship bans that are newly protecting 400 million and 200 million people, respectively.

A 2013 study found that 7 out of 9 recent international human rights treaties contained at least one policy area addressed by the MPOWER strategy, including 30 different articles.

See also
 Tobacco control
 WHO Framework Convention on Tobacco Control
 World Lung Foundation
 World No Tobacco Day

References

Health treaties
World Health Organization treaties
Tobacco control